Littlerock is a census-designated place in California United States. The population was 1,377 at the 2010 census, down from 1,402 at the 2000 census. The Littlerock, and Sun Village community, which is typically referred to as Littlerock, has a population around 15,000. According to the Greater Antelope Valley Economic Alliance report of 2009, the Palmdale / Lancaster urban area has a population of 483,998, which Littlerock is a part of.

Littlerock is named after the Little Rock Wash that passes through the area and is known as "The Fruit Basket of the Antelope Valley."  There were orchards of fruit trees such as almonds, apples, peaches, and pears, along the side of the roads around Highway 138.

Geography
It is surrounded by Palmdale to the northwest, Pearblossom to the southeast, Sun Village to the north, and the San Gabriel Mountains to the south.

Demographics

2010
The 2010 United States Census reported that Littlerock had a population of 1,377. The racial makeup of Littlerock was 808 (58.7%) White (35.5% Non-Hispanic White), 75 (5.4%) African American, 16 (1.2%) Native American, 24 (1.7%) Asian, 11 (0.8%) Pacific Islander, 373 (27.1%) from other races, and 70 (5.1%) from two or more races. Hispanic or Latino of any race were 745 persons (54.1%).

The Census reported that 1,375 people (99.9% of the population) lived in households, 2 (0.1%) lived in non-institutionalized group quarters, and 0 (0%) were institutionalized.

There were 417 households, out of which 193 (46.3%) had children under the age of 18 living in them, 224 (53.7%) were opposite-sex married couples living together, 61 (14.6%) had a female householder with no husband present, 34 (8.2%) had a male householder with no wife present.  There were 28 (6.7%) unmarried opposite-sex partnerships, and 4 (1.0%) same-sex married couples or partnerships. 77 households (18.5%) were made up of individuals, and 24 (5.8%) had someone living alone who was 65 years of age or older. The average household size was 3.30.  There were 319 families (76.5% of all households); the average family size was 3.69.

The population was spread out, with 419 people (30.4%) under the age of 18, 160 people (11.6%) aged 18 to 24, 345 people (25.1%) aged 25 to 44, 344 people (25.0%) aged 45 to 64, and 109 people (7.9%) who were 65 years of age or older.  The median age was 32.3 years. For every 100 females, there were 98.7 males.  For every 100 females age 18 and over, there were 97.1 males.

The homeowner vacancy rate was 2.5%; the rental vacancy rate was 10.3%.  867 people (63.0% of the population) lived in owner-occupied housing units and 508 people (36.9%) lived in rental housing units.

According to the 2010 United States Census, Littlerock had a median household income of $42,617, with 9.5% of the population living below the federal poverty line.

2000
As of the census of 2000, there were 1,402 people, 426 households, and 331 families residing in the census-designated place (CDP). The population density was 967.3 inhabitants per square mile (373.3/km). The racial makeup of the CDP was 71.68% White, 4.78% African American, 1.07% Native American, 0.21% Asian, 19.76% from other races, and 2.50% from two or more races. Hispanic or Latino of any race were 39.73% of the population.

There were 426 households, out of which 49.3% had children under the age of 18 living with them, 56.1% were married couples living together, 12.4% had a female householder with no husband present, and 22.3% were non-families. 17.8% of all households were made up of individuals, and 4.9% had someone living alone who was 65 years of age or older.  The average household size was 3.29 and the average family size was 3.71.

In the CDP, the population was spread out, with 38.5% under the age of 18, 7.5% from 18 to 24, 30.0% from 25 to 44, 16.5% from 45 to 64, and 7.5% who were 65 years of age or older.  The median age was 29 years. For every 100 females, there were 98.0 males.  For every 100 females age 18 and over, there were 99.5 males.

The median income for a household in the CDP was $39,000, and the median income for a family was $50,357. Males had a median income of $46,667 versus $45,625 for females. The per capita income for the CDP was $15,557.  About 19.7% of families and 23.7% of the population were below the poverty line, including 28.6% of those under age 18 and 18.3% of those age 65 or over.

Politics
In the state legislature Littlerock is located in the 17th State Senate district and the 36th State Assembly district.  Federally, Littlerock is located in California's 25th congressional district, which has an Even Cook PVI .

The Los Angeles County Department of Health Services operates the Antelope Valley Health Center in Lancaster, serving Littlerock.

Transportation
Littlerock has motorcoach feeder service to Amtrak California's San Joaquin trains, available at the MB Grocery Discount.

References

External links

Recent articles about Littlerock from the Los Angeles Times

Populated places in the Mojave Desert
Census-designated places in Los Angeles County, California
Geography of Palmdale, California
Census-designated places in California